Broom milkwort is a common name for several plants and may refer to:

Comesperma scoparium, native to Australia
Polygala scoparioides, native to North America